Hiroyo (written:  or ) is a feminine Japanese given name. Notable people with the name include:

, Japanese swimmer
, Japanese professional wrestler

Japanese feminine given names